MyDrink Beverages is a global beverage development company with headquarters in Lithuania, the sales office in United Kingdom and representatives in Denmark and India. It provides beverage development, research, formulation, flavor house selection, contract manufacturing, Bottling management, market research, packaging design and marketing solutions services.

History
MyDrink Beverages was founded in 2008 in Lithuania by Adomas Pranevicius and Kastytis Kemezys. It initially operated as a drinks distributor in Baltic region. Later on it started to sell private label beverages solutions for Clients in Europe.

In 2009 MyDrink Beverages brand was registered in European Union, launched a website and became leaders of Horeca sector in Baltic region for private label beverages.

In 2010 MyDrink Beverages started new projects in France, Germany and Norway. Then it began to offer production management services.
In 2011 this company opened the sales office in Denmark and started to offer beverage development services and trade of raw materials of beverage industry.

In 2012 MyDrink Beverages established its own beverage testing and development laboratory and in 2013 opened the sales office in United Kingdom. It also introduced ready-to-market beverages concepts and beverage lean start-up methodology.

In 2014 MyDrink Beverages became members of London Chamber of Commerce and Industry organizing first beverage accelerator in Europe DrinkPreneur Live 2014. It also began to offer construction management services.

In 2018 MyDrink Beverages was acquired by the U.S. based, BevSource, Inc.

Products
MyDrink Beverages managed development of numerous beverages brands such as NapNock energy shot, HighVit Vitamin Drink, Hello Hungry liquid meal, BrumBrum Vitamin Drink, BCAA 5000 Pre-Workout Drink, Super!Natural energy drink, Newcastle United football club energy drink and Cinnamora soft drink.

Beverages business community
In 2014 MyDrink Beverages created community of beverage entrepreneurs and called it DrinkPreneur. Main purpose of this community is to inspire and help current and new entrepreneurs of beverage industry by providing necessary information and making communication easier between beverage industry members in all the World.

In 2014 MyDrink Beverages in partnership with Zenith international organized first event dedicated to beverage entrepreneurs and named it DrinkPreneur Live. It is European only business accelerator forum with startups awards for new beverage brands, where attended more than 100 startup and early stage brand developers.

See also
 Beverage industry
 Food marketing

References

Drink companies of Lithuania
Food and drink companies established in 2008